Hunter School is a historic building near Tabor, Iowa, United States.  The one-room schoolhouse was built in 1901.  The school was named for John H. Hunter, a farmer and landowner on whose property the original school was built in 1901.  Its use as a schoolhouse came to an end in 1920 when it was consolidated into the Tabor School District.  The building was used as a township meeting and a polling place until 1990.  Since then it has been maintained as a historical landmark.  The former schoolhouse is a frame structure built on a brick foundation, and consists of a  main block and an  square bell tower-entrance.  While the schoolhouse overall follows a basic plan for a one-room schoolhouse, it departs from that plan with the asymmetrically placed corner tower. It was added to the National Register of Historic Places in 2007.

References

National Register of Historic Places in Fremont County, Iowa
School buildings on the National Register of Historic Places in Iowa
School buildings completed in 1901
Buildings and structures in Fremont County, Iowa
Defunct schools in Iowa
1901 establishments in Iowa
One-room schoolhouses in Iowa